The 1995 NCAA Division I Indoor Track and Field Championships were contested to determine the individual and team national champions of men's and women's NCAA collegiate indoor track and field events in the United States after the 1994–95 season, the 31st annual meet for men and 13th annual meet for women.

The championships were again held at the RCA Dome in Indianapolis, Indiana.

Eleven-time defending champions Arkansas again claimed the men's team title, the Razorbacks' twelfth overall.

Two-time defending champions LSU again won the women's team title, the Lady Tigers' sixth.

Qualification
All teams and athletes from Division I indoor track and field programs were eligible to compete for this year's individual and team titles.

Team standings 
 Note: Top 10 only
 Scoring: 6 points for a 1st-place finish in an event, 4 points for 2nd, 3 points for 3rd, 2 points for 4th, and 1 point for 5th
 (DC) = Defending Champions

Men's title
 57 teams scored at least one point

Women's title
 50 teams scored at least one point

References

NCAA Indoor Track and Field Championships
Ncaa Indoor Track And Field Championships
Ncaa Indoor Track And Field Championships